Kerry Kittles (born June 12, 1974) is an American professional basketball coach and former player. He was raised in New Orleans and attended St. Augustine High School. He was an assistant coach at Princeton from 2016 to 2018.

The ,  shooting guard attended Villanova University and was later selected by the New Jersey Nets with the eighth pick in the 1996 NBA draft. He sat out his entire fifth season, in 2000–01, due to rehabilitation from off-season surgery on his right knee. After seven seasons with the Nets, Kittles was traded to the Clippers in a salary purge. After one injury-riddled year with the Los Angeles Clippers, Kittles retired from the NBA. Kittles completed an MBA at Villanova University's School of Business.

He holds the Villanova University record for most points scored, with 2,243, was inducted into the team's Hall of Fame and had his #30 retired by the school. Kittles is a member of Kappa Alpha Psi fraternity.

High school career
Kittles attended St. Augustine High School and was considered to be one of the best basketball talents to ever come out of New Orleans. He led St. Augustine to a 66–5 record in his last two seasons while also earning first-team all-metro and all-state honors under head coach Bernard Griffith. As a junior, Kittles led the Purple Knights to the 1991 state finals. As a senior he averaged 22.5 points per game for St. Augustine as they finished with a 32–3 record. The team defeated John Ehret High School in the 1992 Class 5A state championship game. He was named Louisiana Mr. Basketball in 1992.

College career
After finishing high school, Kittles attended Villanova University and played for its Wildcats basketball team. Kittles' commitment to Villanova was a surprise to Louisiana basketball fans by going out of state.

Kittles contemplated on transferring when head coach Rollie Massimino left for UNLV before his freshman year. New head coach, Steve Lappas flew to New Orleans the day after he was hired to convince Kittles to stay at Villanova.

Possessing an accurate quick trigger jump shot from the deep while using his long athletic  frame to drive and finish strong at the rim, as well as being a heady player with tenacious defensive will, would allow Kittles to become one of the most decorated players ever in the school's history. Kittles ended his college career as Villanova's all-time leader for most points (2,243) and steals (277). As a sophomore he led the Wildcats to the 1994 NIT Championship. Kittles made All-Big East as a junior averaging 21.4 points per game and led Villanova to the 1995 Big East tournament championship. He won the Big East tournament MVP award and would garner Consensus All-American honors. In his senior season, Kittles averaged 20 points per game, was named All-Big 5 Player of the Year for the second time, and again received All-Big East and All-American honors with Villanova earning a national no. 2 rank at one point but getting upset in the NCAA Tournament by Louisville in the second round.

Professional career
In the 1996 NBA draft, Kittles was selected eighth overall by the New Jersey Nets. Kittles made the NBA All-Rookie Second Team for the 1996–97 season, after averaging 16.7 points, 3.9 rebounds, 3 assists, and 1.9 steals a game. On April 13, 1997, Kittles scored a career-best 40 points in a 123–132 loss to the Milwaukee Bucks. That same season, he set the Nets' franchise record and NBA rookie record for three-point field goals made with 158.

Kittles enjoyed a productive seven-year stint starting at shooting guard for the Nets. However, after he averaged 16.4 points per game as a rookie, followed by 17.2 points per game as a second-year player, knee injuries began to slow his game. Kittles would have four operations in five years. He missed the 2000–01 season due to a knee injury. He posted three seasons shooting over 40 percent from the three-point range and helped Jason Kidd to take the Nets to back to back NBA Finals appearances in 2002 and 2003.

After leaving the Nets, Kittles ranked in the team's history as seventh in field goals (2,751), third in three-point field goals (687) and third in steals (803).

Kittles ended his nine-year NBA career with one injury-riddled season with the Los Angeles Clippers.

Coaching career
Kittles was an assistant coach at Princeton from 2016 to 2018.

Personal life
Kittles, together with his wife, four daughters and one son, has been a resident of Harding Township, New Jersey.

Kittles is Catholic and religion is an important part of his life. He chose to attend Villanova because it is a Catholic institution, stating at the time:
"It was a smaller institution, it was a Catholic school, its basketball games were on television and I had the opportunity to play. But the biggest factor was its graduation rate."

Kittles eventually became a Eucharistic Minister in 1996, which he still volunteers as, as of 2020.

Kittles gained his Master of Business Administration from Villanova in 2009 and is a member of the Board of Trustees.

Career statistics

NBA

Regular season

|-
| style="text-align:left;"|
| style="text-align:left;"|New Jersey
| 82 || 57 || 36.7 || .426 || .377 || .771 || 3.9 || 3.0 || 1.9 || .4 || 16.4
|-
| style="text-align:left;"|
| style="text-align:left;"|New Jersey
| 77 || 76 || 36.5 || .440 || .418 || .808 || 4.7 || 2.3 || 1.7 || .5 || 17.2
|-
| style="text-align:left;"|
| style="text-align:left;"|New Jersey
| 46 || 40 || 34.1 || .370 || .316 || .772 || 4.2 || 2.5 || 1.7 || .6 || 12.9
|-
| style="text-align:left;"|
| style="text-align:left;"|New Jersey
| 62 || 61 || 30.6 || .437 || .400 || .795 || 3.6 || 2.3 || 1.3 || .3 || 13.0
|-
| style="text-align:left;"|
| style="text-align:left;"|New Jersey
| 82 || 82 || 31.7 || .466 || .405 || .744 || 3.4 || 2.6 || 1.6 || .4 || 13.4
|-
| style="text-align:left;"|
| style="text-align:left;"|New Jersey
| 65 || 57 || 30.0 || .467 || .356 || .785 || 3.9 || 2.6 || 1.6 || .5 || 13.0
|-
| style="text-align:left;"|
| style="text-align:left;"|New Jersey
| 82 || 82 || 34.7 || .453 || .351 || .787 || 4.0 || 2.5 || 1.5 || .5 || 13.1
|-
| style="text-align:left;"|
| style="text-align:left;"|L.A. Clippers
| 11 || 0 || 22.1 || .384 || .333 || .600 || 2.9 || 1.8 || .7 || .3 || 6.3
|- class="sortbottom"
| style="text-align:center;" colspan="2"|Career
| 507 || 455 || 33.4 || .439 || .378 || .780 || 3.9 || 2.6 || 1.6 || .4 || 14.1

Playoffs

|-
| style="text-align:left;"|1998
| style="text-align:left;"|New Jersey
| 3 || 3 || 42.0 || .425 || .385 || .909 || 5.0 || 2.7 || 1.3 || .7 || 16.3
|-
| style="text-align:left;"|2002
| style="text-align:left;"|New Jersey
| 20 || 20 || 29.0 || .435 || .265 || .778 || 3.2 || 2.3 || 1.6 || .5 || 12.1
|-
| style="text-align:left;"|2003
| style="text-align:left;"|New Jersey
| 20 || 20 || 30.7 || .395 || .413 || .762 || 3.5 || 2.0 || 1.5 || .3 || 10.8
|-
| style="text-align:left;"|2004
| style="text-align:left;"|New Jersey
| 11 || 11 || 37.7 || .448 || .327 || .618 || 4.3 || 2.1 || 2.0 || .9 || 14.4
|- class="sortbottom"
| style="text-align:center;" colspan="2"|Career
| 54 || 54 || 32.1 || .424 || .337 || .742 || 3.6 || 2.1 || 1.6 || .5 || 12.3

College

|-
| style="text-align:left;"|1992–93
| style="text-align:left;"|Villanova
| 27 ||  || 32.4 || .482 || .432 || .673 || 3.5 || 2.9 || 1.7 || .4 || 10.9
|-
| style="text-align:left;"|1993–94
| style="text-align:left;"|Villanova
| 32 ||  || 39.3 || .452 || .349 || .705 || 6.5 || 3.4 || 2.7 || .4 || 19.7
|-
| style="text-align:left;"|1994–95
| style="text-align:left;"|Villanova
| 33 || 33 || 36.9 || .524 || .411 || .767 || 6.1 || 3.5 || 2.2 || .4 || 21.4
|-
| style="text-align:left;"|1995–96
| style="text-align:left;"|Villanova
| 30 || 29 || 35.3 || .455 || .404 || .710 || 7.1 || 3.5 || 2.4 || .4 || 20.4
|- class="sortbottom"
| style="text-align:center;" colspan="2"|Career
| 122 || 62 || 36.1 || .478 || .394 || .719 || 5.9 || 3.3 || 2.3 || .4 || 18.4

References

External links

 Princeton profile

1974 births
Living people
20th-century African-American sportspeople
21st-century African-American sportspeople
African-American basketball players
African-American Catholics
All-American college men's basketball players
American men's basketball coaches
American men's basketball players
American Roman Catholics
Basketball coaches from Louisiana
Basketball coaches from Ohio
Basketball players from New Orleans
Basketball players from Dayton, Ohio
Los Angeles Clippers players
Medalists at the 1995 Summer Universiade
New Jersey Nets draft picks
New Jersey Nets players
People from Harding Township, New Jersey
Princeton Tigers men's basketball coaches
Shooting guards
Small forwards
St. Augustine High School (New Orleans) alumni
Universiade gold medalists for the United States
Universiade medalists in basketball
Villanova Wildcats men's basketball players